Epigen also known as epithelial mitogen is a protein that in humans is encoded by the EPGN gene.

Function 
The protein encoded by this gene is a member of the epidermal growth factor family. Members of this family are ligands for the epidermal growth factor receptor and play a role in cell survival, proliferation and migration. This protein has been reported to have high mitogenic activity but low affinity for its receptor. Expression of this transcript and protein have been reported in cancer specimens of the breast, bladder, and prostate.

References

External links